GameSpot is an American video gaming website that provides news, reviews, previews, downloads, and other information on video games. The site was launched on May 1, 1996, created by Pete Deemer, Vince Broady and Jon Epstein. In addition to the information produced by GameSpot staff, the site also allows users to write their own reviews, blogs, and post on the site's forums. It has been owned by Fandom, Inc. since October 2022.

In 2004, GameSpot won "Best Gaming Website" as chosen by the viewers in Spike TV's second Video Game Award Show, and has won Webby Awards several times. The domain gamespot.com attracted at least 60 million visitors annually by October 2008 according to a Compete.com study.

History
In January 1996, Pete Deemer, Vince Broady and Jon Epstein quit their positions at IDG and founded SpotMedia Communications. SpotMedia then launched GameSpot on May 1, 1996. Originally, GameSpot focused solely on personal computer games, so a sister site, VideoGameSpot, was launched on December 1, 1996. Eventually VideoGameSpot, then renamed VideoGames.com, was merged into GameSpot. In February 1999, PC Magazine named GameSpot one of the hundred best websites, alongside competitors IGN and CNET Gamecenter. The following year, The New York Times declared GameSpot and Gamecenter the "Time and Newsweek of gaming sites".

In October 2005, GameSpot adopted a new design similar to that of TV.com, now considered a sister site to GameSpot.

GameSpot ran a few different paid subscriptions from 2006 to 2013, but is no longer running those.

A new layout change was adopted in October 2013.

In October 2022, Fandom acquired GameSpot, along with Metacritic, TV Guide, GameFAQs, Giant Bomb, Cord Cutters News, and Comic Vine from Red Ventures.

International history
GameSpot UK (United Kingdom) was started in October 1997 and operated until mid-2002, offering content that was oriented for the British market that often differed from that of the U.S. site. During this period, GameSpot UK won the 1999 PPAi (Periodical Publishers Association interactive) award for best website, and was short listed in 2001. PC Gaming World was considered a "sister print magazine" and some content appeared on both GameSpot UK and PC Gaming World. Following the purchase of ZDNet by CNET, GameSpot UK was merged with the main US site. On April 24, 2006, GameSpot UK was relaunched.

In a similar fashion, GameSpot AU (Australia) existed on a local scale in the late 1990s with Australian-produced reviews. It ceased in 2003. When a local version of the main CNET portal, CNET.com.au was launched in 2003, GameSpot AU content was folded into CNET.com.au. The site was fully re-launched in mid-2006, with a specialized forum, local reviews, special features, local pricings in Australian dollars, Australian release dates, and more local news.

Gerstmann dismissal
Jeff Gerstmann, editorial director of the site, was fired on November 28, 2007. Immediately after his termination, rumors circulated proclaiming his dismissal was a result of external pressure from Eidos Interactive, the publisher of Kane & Lynch: Dead Men, which had purchased a considerable amount of advertising space on GameSpots website. Gerstmann had previously given Kane & Lynch a fair or undesirable rating along with critique. Both GameSpot and parent company CNET stated that his dismissal was unrelated to the review, but due to corporate and legal constraints could not reveal the reason. A month after Gerstmann's termination, freelance reviewer Frank Provo left GameSpot after eight years, stating that "I believe CNET management let Jeff go for all the wrong reasons. I believe CNET intends to soften the site's tone and push for higher scores to make advertisers happy."

Notable staff
 Greg Kasavin – executive editor and site director of GameSpot, who left in 2007 to become a game developer. He became a producer at EA and 2K Games. As of 2021, he was working for Supergiant Games as a writer and creative director.
 Jeff Gerstmann – editorial director of the site, dismissed from GameSpot on November 28, 2007, for undisclosed reasons, after which he started Giant Bomb. Following the announcement of the purchase of Giant Bomb by CBS Interactive on March 15, 2012, Jeff was allowed to reveal that he was dismissed by management as a result of publishers threatening to pull advertising revenue due to less-than-glowing review scores being awarded by GameSpots editorial team.
 Danny O'Dwyer – video presenter of GameSpot, founded crowdfunded game documentary company Noclip in 2016.

Community features
GameSpots forums were originally run by ZDNet, and later by Lithium. GameSpot uses a semi-automated moderation system with numerous volunteer moderators. GameSpot moderators are picked by paid GameSpot staff from members of the GameSpot user community. Due to the size and massive quantity of boards and posts on GameSpot, there is a "report" feature where a normal user can report a violation post to an unpaid moderator volunteer.

In addition to the message board system, GameSpot has expanded its community through the addition of features such as user blogs (formerly known as "journals") and user video blogs. Users can track other users, thus allowing them to see updates for their favorite blogs. If both users track each other, they are listed on each other's friends list.

See also
 GameSpot Game of the Year awards

References

External links
 
 GameSpot UK (archived)
 GameSpot France (archived)
 GameSpot Germany (archived)

Internet properties established in 1996
Video game Internet forums
Video game news websites
Webby Award winners
2020 mergers and acquisitions
2022 mergers and acquisitions
Former CBS Interactive websites
Fandom (website)
Spike Video Game Award winners